Route 116 is a  north–south (though in its northern part it is more east-west) state highway in Massachusetts. The route runs from Route 20A in Springfield through mill towns, college towns and rural towns, crossing the Connecticut River three times before finally ending at Route 8 in Adams.

Route description

Route 116 begins at Route 20A in Springfield, just before that route ends at its parent route and I-91.  The route junctions with the interstate officially at Exit 11, before entering the city of Chicopee.  The route crosses I-91 without junction before meeting I-391 twice, on either side of the Chicopee River.  It then crosses under the Massachusetts Turnpike (I-90) before curling through Chicomansett Village.  In the northwest corner of Chicopee Route 141 becomes concurrent with the route, just east of I-391, which it crosses without junction.  It then crosses the Willimansett Bridge into Holyoke, passing through the downtown area on two one-way streets, with Route 141 leaving the route during that time.  It then becomes one route again, crossing a canal before crossing the Vietnam Memorial Bridge into South Hadley and Hampshire County.

In South Hadley, Route 116 meets U.S. Route 202 with a cloverleaf interchange.  After meeting the northern end of Route 33 it continues northward, passing Mount Holyoke College, where Route 47 begins.  It then turns northeastward, passing through the northwest corner of Granby before clipping South Hadley again on the way into Amherst.  The route passes Hampshire College and Amherst College before meeting Route 9 at the center of town.  Route 116 then becomes concurrent with Route 9, heading southwestward before entering Hadley. Route 116 leaves the route 9 concurrency and turns northward as a four lane divided freeway. It passes the western edge of UMass Amherst, passing behind Warren McGuirk Alumni Stadium and having an interchange with North Hadley Road, which connects the route directly to the university. The route narrows to a two lane undivided road and meets the southern end of Route 63 before meeting Sunderland Road before passing into Franklin County and the town of Sunderland.

In Sunderland, Route 116 passes west of the Great Swamp and Bull Hill before crossing Route 47 again in the town center before crossing the Connecticut River a third time, over the Sunderland Bridge into Deerfield.  The route then meets U.S. Route 5 and Route 10 just over the Whately town line, and just north of I-91 Exit 24.  It then follows Routes 5 & 10 for about a mile before leaving the route, heading westward and crossing I-91 at Exit 25.  The route heads northwestward, passing through the Mill River area of town and passing into Conway.

Once the route enters Conway, it becomes a winding route, passing through that town center before continuing into Ashfield.  In Ashfield, the route becomes Main Street, before it has a wrong-way concurrency with Route 112 for nearly a mile and a half.  the route then turns westward, passing Spruce Corner on its way back into Hampshire County and the town of Plainfield.  The route acts as the main road through the town before meeting Route 8A near the Dubuque Memorial State Forest.  The two routes head westward into Berkshire County and the town of Savoy.  In Savoy, Route 8A heads south while Route 116 heads westward into the town of Cheshire.  Route 116 passes through the northeast corner of town before entering Adams and finally terminating at Route 8 in the southern end of downtown Adams.

History
Prior to 1955, Route 116 did not have a concurrency with Route 9 or enter Hadley.  Rather, it continued along Pleasant Street and North Pleasant Street, passing along the eastern side of UMass before meeting Sunderland Road, where it rejoins the current route. This was done to lessen traffic along the edge of the campus.  When the route was moved, Route 63's southern terminus was also moved along Meadow Street to connect it back to Route 116.

Before the introduction of Interstate 91, Route 116 extended down to the Memorial Bridge in Springfield where U.S. Route 5 and U.S. Route 20 crossed the river at the time.

In 2012, part of the road near Atkins Farm in Amherst was relocated to the east to remove a sharp curve in the road.  This was done via the construction of two neighboring roundabouts.

Major intersections

References

External links

 Route 116—Western Massachusetts Scenic Byways
 Route 116 Scenic Byway Corridor Management Plan, July 2013—includes a history of the road and other information (PDF files)

116